The 12687 / 12688 Madurai–Chandigarh Express is a Superfast Express train of Indian Railways – Southern Railway zone that runs between  in Tamil Nadu and  in Punjab and Haryana, India. The slip coaches to Dehradun was permanently discontinued with effect from July 11, 2021.

It operates as train number 12687 from Madurai Junction to Chandigarh Junction and as train number 12688 in the reverse direction, serving the states of Tamil Nadu, Andhra Pradesh, Telangana, Maharashtra, Madhya Pradesh, Delhi, Uttar Pradesh, Haryana and Punjab.

It previously ran only up to  being recently extended to Madurai Junction. It carried slip coaches to Dehradun. But after July 11 2021, the slip coaches to Dehradun was permanently discontinued and it runs as a single train to Chandigarh from Madurai Junction, with revised coach position.

History

It was first introduced as a Bi-Weekly Superfast Express between Chennai Central to Chandigarh and slip coaches to Dehradun as Chennai–Dehradun Link Express.

Later in 2014, it was extended up to Madurai Junction and ran as Madurai Junction–Chandigarh / Dehradun Link Superfast Express. After July 11, 2021, the slip coaches to Dehradun was discontinued and it runs as a single train to Chandigarh without Dehradun Link Express coaches. Therefore, at present it runs as Madurai Junction–Chandigarh Bi-Weekly Superfast Express. Also it was diverted to run via, Perambur (Chennai), without touching Chennai Central since it has to take reversal done at Chennai Central. At present it takes reversal done only at Erode Junction, it bypasses Chennai Central by without taking reversal. The coach position was also changed. After July 21, 2021, it will not carry AC First Class. It runs with AC Two Tier, AC Three,pantry car,Sleeper class and General Unreserved.

Coaches

The 12687 / 88 Madurai–Chandigarh Superfast Express presently has,

 1 AC Two Tier, 
 3 AC Three Tier, 
 10 Sleeper class, 
 1 Pantry car, 
 4 General Unreserved, 
 2 SLR (Seating cum Luggage Rake).

Service

The 22687 Madurai–Chandigarh Superfast Express covers the distance of 3074 kilometres in 52 hours 15 mins (57.94 km/hr). It takes 53 hours 50 mins as 22688 Chandigarh–Madurai Express (57.17 km/hr).

As the average speed of the train is above , as per Indian Railways rules, its fare includes a Superfast surcharge.

Routeing

Ambala Cantonment, Yamuna Nagar to Chandigarh.

Direction reversal

Traction

Two locomotives are assigned to haul this train during its journey.

References

External links

Express trains in India
Rail transport in Tamil Nadu
Rail transport in Andhra Pradesh
Rail transport in Maharashtra
Rail transport in Madhya Pradesh
Rail transport in Delhi
Trains from Dehradun